Sago is a starch extracted from the pith, or spongy core tissue, of various tropical palm stems, especially those of Metroxylon sagu. It is a major staple food for the lowland peoples of New Guinea and the Maluku Islands, where it is called saksak, rabia and sagu. The largest supply of sago comes from Southeast Asia, particularly Indonesia and Malaysia. Large quantities of sago are sent to Europe and North America for cooking purposes. It is traditionally cooked and eaten in various forms, such as rolled into balls, mixed with boiling water to form a glue-like paste (papeda), or as a pancake.

Sago is often produced commercially in the form of "pearls" (small rounded starch aggregates, partly gelatinized by heating). Sago pearls can be boiled with water or milk and sugar to make a sweet sago pudding. Sago pearls are similar in appearance to the pearled starches of other origin, e.g. cassava starch (tapioca) and potato starch.  They may be used interchangeably in some dishes, and tapioca pearls are often marketed as "sago", since they are much cheaper to produce.  Compared to tapioca pearls, real sago pearls are off-white, uneven in size, brittle and cook very quickly.

The name sago is also sometimes used for starch extracted from other sources, especially the sago cycad, Cycas revoluta. The sago cycad is also commonly known as the sago palm, although this is a misnomer as cycads are not palms. Extracting edible starch from the sago cycad requires special care due to the poisonous nature of cycads. Cycad sago is used for many of the same purposes as palm sago.

The fruit of palm trees from which the sago is produced is not allowed to ripen fully, as full ripening completes the life cycle of the tree and exhausts the starch reserves in the trunk to produce the seeds to the point of death, leaving a hollow shell. The palms are cut down when they are about 15 years old, just before or shortly after the inflorescence appears. The starch-containing pith is taken from the stems and ground to powder. The powder is kneaded in water over a cloth or sieve to release the starch. The water with the starch passes into a trough where the starch settles. After a few washings, the starch is ready to be used in cooking.

Historical records 
Sago was noted by the Chinese historian Zhao Rukuo (1170–1231) during the Song Dynasty. In his Zhu Fan Zhi (1225), a collection of descriptions of foreign countries, he writes that the kingdom of Boni "produces no wheat, but hemp and rice, and they use sha-hu (sago) for grain".

Sources, extraction and preparation

Palm sago

The sago palm, Metroxylon sagu, is found in tropical lowland forest and freshwater swamps across Southeast Asia and New Guinea and is the primary source of sago. It tolerates a wide variety of soils and may reach 30 meters in height (including the leaves). Several other species of the genus Metroxylon, particularly Metroxylon salomonense and Metroxylon amicarum, are also used as sources of sago throughout Melanesia and Micronesia.

Sago palms grow very quickly, in clumps of different ages similar to bananas, one sucker matures, then flowers and dies. It is replaced by another sucker, with up to 1.5 m of vertical stem growth per year. The stems are thick and are either self-supporting or have a moderate climbing habit; the leaves are pinnate. Each palm trunk produces a single inflorescence at its tip at the end of its life. Sago palms are harvested at the age of 7–15 years, just before or shortly after the inflorescence appears and when the stems are full of starch stored for use in reproduction. One palm can yield 150–300 kg of starch.

Sago is extracted from Metroxylon palms by splitting the stem lengthwise and removing the pith which is then crushed and kneaded to release the starch before being washed and strained to extract the starch from the fibrous residue. The raw starch suspension in water is then collected in a settling container.

Cycad sago
The sago cycad, Cycas revoluta, is a slow-growing wild or ornamental plant. Its common names "sago palm" and "king sago palm" are misnomers as cycads are not palms. Processed starch known as sago is made from this and other cycads. It is a less-common food source for some peoples of the Pacific and Indian Oceans. Unlike metroxylon palms (discussed above), cycads are highly poisonous: most parts of the plant contain the neurotoxins cycasin and BMAA. Consumption of cycad seeds has been implicated in the outbreak of Parkinson's disease-like neurological disorder in Guam and other locations in the Pacific. Thus, before any part of the plant may safely be eaten the toxins must be removed through extended processing.

Sago is extracted from the sago cycad by cutting the pith from the stem, root and seeds of the cycads, grinding the pith to a coarse flour, before being dried, pounded, and soaked. The starch is then washed carefully and repeatedly to leach out the natural toxins. The starchy residue is then dried and cooked, producing a starch similar to palm sago/sabudana.

The cycad seed should not be eaten as it remains highly toxic after washing.

Cassava sago

In many countries including Australia, Brazil, and India, tapioca pearls made from cassava root are also referred to as sago, sagu, sabudana, etc.

Uses

Nutrition
Sago palms are typically found in areas unsuited for other forms of agriculture, so sago cultivation is often the most ecologically appropriate form of land-use and the nutritional deficiencies of the food can often be compensated for with other readily available foods.

Sago starch can be baked (resulting in a product analogous to bread, pancake, or biscuit) or mixed with boiling water to form a paste. It is a main staple of many traditional communities in New Guinea and Maluku in the form of papeda, Borneo,  South Sulawesi (most known in Luwu Regency) and Sumatra. In Palembang, sago is one of the ingredients to make pempek. In Brunei, it is used for making the popular local dish called the ambuyat. It is also used commercially in making noodles and white bread. Sago starch can also be used as a thickener for other dishes. It can be made into steamed puddings such as sago plum pudding.

In Malaysia, the traditional food "keropok lekor" (fish cracker) uses sago as one of its main ingredients. In the making of the popular keropok lekor of Losong in Kuala Terengganu, each kilogram of fish meat is mixed with half a kilogram of fine sago, with a little salt added for flavour. Tons of raw sago are imported each year into Malaysia to support the keropok lekor industry.

In 1805, two captured crew members of the shipwrecked schooner Betsey were kept alive until their escape from an undetermined island on a diet of sago.

Any starch can be pearled by heating and stirring small aggregates of moist starch, producing partly gelatinized dry kernels which swell but remain intact on boiling. Pearl sago closely resembles pearl tapioca. Both are typically small (about 2 mm diameter) dry, opaque balls. Both may be white (if very pure) or colored naturally gray, brown or black, or artificially pink, yellow, green, etc. When soaked and cooked, both become much larger, translucent, soft and spongy. Both are widely used in Indian, Bangladeshi and Sri Lankan cuisine in a variety of dishes and around the world, usually in puddings. In India, it is used in a variety of dishes such as desserts boiled with sweetened milk on occasion of religious fasts.

Textile production
Sago starch is also used to treat fiber in a process is called sizing, which makes fibers easier to machine. The process helps to bind the fiber, give it a predictable slip for running on metal, standardize the level of hydration of the fiber and give the textile more body. Most cloth and clothing has been sized; this leaves a residue which is removed in the first wash.

Other uses
Because many traditional people rely on sago-palm as their main food staple and because those supplies of these are not unlimited, in some areas commercial or industrial harvesting of wild stands of sago-palm can conflict with the food needs of local communities.

See also
Arenga pinnata
Landang
Sandige

References

Citations

General and cited references 
 Flach, M. and F. Rumawas, eds. (1996). Plant Resources of South-East Asia (PROSEA) No. 9: Plants Yielding Non-Seed Carbohydrates. Leiden: Blackhuys.
 Lie, Goan-Hong. (1980). "The Comparative Nutritional Roles of Sago and Cassava in Indonesia." In: Stanton, W.R. and M. Flach, eds., Sago: The Equatorial Swamp as a Natural Resource. The Hague, Boston, London: Martinus Nijhoff.
 McClatchey, W., H.I. Manner, and C.R. Elevitch. (2005). [http://www.agroforestry.net/tti/Metroxylon-sagopalm.pdf "Metroxylon amicarum, M. paulcoxii, M. sagu, M. salomonense, M. vitiense, and M. warburgii (sago palm), ver. 1.1". In: Elevitch, C.R. (ed.) Species Profiles for Pacific Island Agroforestry. Permanent Agriculture Resources (PAR), Holualoa, Hawaii.
 Pickell, D. (2002). Between the Tides: A Fascinating Journey Among the Kamoro of New Guinea. Singapore: Periplus Press.
 
 Stanton, W.R. and M. Flach, eds., Sago: The Equatorial Swamp as a Natural Resource. The Hague, Boston, London: Martinus Nijhoff.

Further reading

External links
 Species profile for Metroxylon sagu
 http://www.fao.org/ag/agA/AGAP/FRG/AFRIS/Data/416.HTM
 Sago Uses

Edible thickening agents
Food ingredients
Indian cuisine
Indonesian cuisine
Melanesian cuisine
Oceanian cuisine
Papua New Guinean cuisine
Staple foods
Tropical agriculture